An aerial lift, also known as a cable car or ropeway, is a means of cable transport in which cabins, cars, gondolas, or open chairs are hauled above the ground by means of one or more cables. Aerial lift systems are frequently employed in a mountainous territory where roads are relatively difficult to build and use, and have seen extensive use in mining. Aerial lift systems are relatively easy to move and have been used to cross rivers and ravines. In more recent times, the cost-effectiveness and flexibility of aerial lifts have seen an increase of gondola lift being integrated into urban public transport systems.

Types

Cable Car

A cable car (British English) or an aerial tramway, aerial tram (American English), uses one or two stationary ropes for support while a separate moving rope provides propulsion. The grip of an aerial tramway is permanently fixed onto the propulsion rope. Aerial trams used for urban transport include the Roosevelt Island Tramway in New York City, as well as the Portland Aerial Tram.

Gondola lift

A gondola lift consists of a continuously circulating cable that is strung between two or more stations, over intermediate supporting towers. The cable is driven by a bullwheel in a terminal, which is connected to an engine or electric motor. Multiple gondola cabins are attached to the cable, usually with detachable grips, enabling them to slow down in the stations to facilitate safe boarding. Fixed grip variants exist, although these are considerably less common. Lifts with a single cable are sometimes referred to as "mono-cable" gondola lifts. Depending on the design of the individual lift, the capacity, cost, and functionality of a gondola lift will differ dramatically. Because of the proliferation of such systems in the Alpine regions of Europe, the French language name of télécabine is also used in an English language context. Gondola lifts are also used for urban transportation. Examples include the Singapore Cable Car, Metrocable (Medellín), Metrocable (Caracas), Mi Teleférico (La Paz), and London Cable Car.

Bicable and tricable gondola lifts

Gondola lifts which feature one stationary 'support' rope and one haul rope are known as bi-cable gondola lifts, while lifts that feature two support ropes and one haul rope are known as tri-cable gondola lifts. Examples include Ngong Ping Skyrail (Hong Kong) and the Peak 2 Peak Gondola (Canada).

Funitel

A funitel differs from a standard gondola through the use of two overhead arms, attached to two parallel haul cables, providing more stability in high winds. The name funitel is a blend of the French words funiculaire and telepherique. Systems may sometimes be referred to as "double monocable" (DMC), where two separate haul cables are used, or "double loop monocable" (DLM) where a single haul cable is looped round twice.

Funitels combine a short time between successive cabins with a high capacity (20 to 30 people) per cabin.

Funifor

A funifor is a type of cable car with two support ropes and a haul rope, looped around. Each system is composed of a single cabin shuttling back-and-forth. Many installations are built with two parallel, but independent, lines. The funifor design was developed by the Italian manufacturer, Hölzl, which later merged with Doppelmayr Italia. Today, the design is therefore patented by Doppelmayr Garaventa Group.

At the top of each track, the haul rope loops back to the bottom instead of looping over to serve the other track, as would occur with a normal aerial tramway. This is shown in the diagram below. This feature allows for a single cabin operation when traffic warrants. The independent drive also allows for evacuations to occur by means of a bridge connection between the adjacent cabins.

The main advantage of the funifor system is its stability in high wind conditions owing to the horizontal distance between the two support ropes.

Chairlift

Chairlifts are continuously circulating systems carrying chairs, which usually enable skiers to board without removing skis. They are a common type of lift at most ski areas and in mountainous areas. They can also be found at some amusement parks and tourist attractions.

Chairs may be fitted with a "bubble" canopy to offer weather protection.

Hybrid lift 

A hybrid lift is a fusion of a gondola lift and a chair lift. The company Leitner refers to it as telemix, while Doppelmayr uses the term combination lift. An example is Ski Arlberg's Weibermahd lift in Vorarlberg (Austria) which alternates between 8-person chairlifts and 10-person gondolas.

Hand-powered 

In undeveloped areas with rough terrain, simple hand-powered cable-cars may be used for crossing rivers, such as the tuin used in Nepal.

Material ropeways

A material ropeway or ropeway conveyor is an aerial lift from which containers for goods rather than passenger cars are suspended. These are usually monocable or bicable gondola lifts.

Material ropeways are typically found around large mining concerns, and can be of considerable length. The COMILOG Cableway, which ran from Moanda in Gabon to Mbinda in the Republic of the Congo, was over 75 km in length. The Norsjö aerial tramway in Sweden had a length of 96 kilometers.

Abbreviations
The following abbreviations are frequently used in the industry:

See also

Blondin (quarry equipment)
Cable car (railway)
Funicular
List of aerial lift manufacturers
Space elevator
Surface lift, another transportation technology

References

 
Vertical transport devices
Articles containing video clips